Wolsztynski or Wolsztyński may refer to:

Wolsztynski
Richard Wolsztynski {b. 1948}, French Air Force general

Wolsztyński
Łukasz Wolsztyński (b. 1994), a Polish footballer
Rafał Wolsztyński (b. 1994), a Polish footballer

See also
Wolsztyn County, a Polish county